Commerce and Trade Park is a light rail station of the Circular Line of the Kaohsiung rapid transit system. It is located in Cianjhen District, Kaohsiung, Taiwan.

Station overview
The station is a street-level station with two side platforms. It is located at the junction of Jhengcin Road and Chenggong 2nd Road.

Station layout

 Taipower South Area Power Plant

References

2015 establishments in Taiwan
Railway stations opened in 2015
Circular light rail stations